Nuevo amanecer (New dawn) is a Mexican telenovela produced by Ernesto Alonso for Televisa in 1988.

Jacqueline Andere and Pedro Armendáriz, Jr. starred as protagonists, while Blanca Guerra starred as antagonist. Daniela Castro, Salma Hayek and Raúl Araiza starred as co-protagonists.

Plot
This is the story of Laura, a beautiful mature, shy and abused by her mother Elena, who works as a school teacher. She lives with a past trauma that occurred in her childhood, she was raped by her stepfather. When her mother dies, Laura inherits her fortune and goes to live with her great friend Norma, who also works with Laura in the high school and Norma has a completely opposite character. Laura decides to take a trip where she meets Gerardo, and she falls in love, but in turn, she suffers because it reminds her of her stepfather’s sexual abuse. But Laura also has to deal with a cruel person that wants to destroy her and has to also deal with the mysterious anonymous person that appears suddenly, and sends letters to Laura indicating that it’s her dead mother who came back to life and back to reality. To worsen the situation, Laura has gotten involved with a married man,Felipe. Felipe finds out about her breast cancer and he hides something so sinister that it will possibly change Laura’s feelings towards him. Find out what happens.

Cast 

Jacqueline Andere as Laura de la Rosa Treviño Montiel
Pedro Armendáriz, Jr. as Gerardo
Blanca Guerra as Norma
Daniela Castro as Patricia Ortiz
Salma Hayek as Fabiola Ramírez Anthony
Raúl Araiza as EstebanAraceli Aguilar as Amparo LunaRoberto Antúnez as ArnulfoJerardo as Manuel
Norma Lazareno as Marisa BasurtoRita Macedo as Elena Vda. de TreviñoMaristel Molina as NievesAlejandra Morales as ErnestinaManuel Ojeda as Samuel RamírezRebeca Silva as Diana OrtizHéctor Suárez Gomís as Paco LanderosGilberto Trujillo as LuisEduardo Liñán as FelipeTeresa Velázquez as Gladys AnthonyFlor Trujillo as Elizabeth SheldanGuillermo Aguilar as Javier MaldonadoGraciela Döring as BenitaDolores Beristáin as AdelaFabio Ramírez
Humberto Elizondo as AníbalClaudia Fernández as GinaMarco Hernán as ÁngelOscar Traven as Tom SheldanFabiola Elenka Tapia as Laura Treviño (young)Graciela Bernardo  as CoraRoberto Antúnez 
Enrique Hidalgo as Fabiola's Doctor ''

Awards

References

External links

1988 telenovelas
Mexican telenovelas
1988 Mexican television series debuts
1989 Mexican television series endings
Spanish-language telenovelas
Television shows set in Mexico
Televisa telenovelas